Doyle E. Carlton Jr. (July 4, 1922 – May 10, 2003) was an American politician. He served as a Democratic member for the 27th district of the Florida Senate.

Life and career 
Carlton was born in Tampa, Florida, the son of the 25th governor of Florida, Doyle E. Carlton. He attended Henry B. Plant High School and the University of Florida. He served in the United States Air Force.

In 1953, Carlton was elected to represent the 27th district of the Florida Senate, succeeding James W. Moore. He served until 1959, when he was succeeded by Dick Williams. The next year, he was a Democratic candidate for governor of Florida. In 1965, he was re-elected to the 27th district, serving until 1966.

Carlton died in May 2003 of cancer, at the age of 80.

References 

1922 births
2003 deaths
Politicians from Tampa, Florida
Democratic Party Florida state senators
20th-century American politicians
University of Florida alumni
Deaths from cancer